The 1996 NCAA Division III football season, part of the college football season organized by the NCAA at the Division III level in the United States, began in August 1996, and concluded with the NCAA Division III Football Championship, also known as the Stagg Bowl, in December 1996 at Salem Football Stadium in Salem, Virginia. The Mount Union Purple Raiders won their second Division III championship by defeating the Rowan Profs, 56−24. The Gagliardi Trophy, given to the most outstanding player in Division III football, was awarded to Lon Erickson, quarterback from Illinois Wesleyan.

Conference and program changes

Conference changes
 The American Southwest Conference began its first season of play in 1996.
 The Texas Intercollegiate Athletic Association dissolved after the 1996 season when most of members joined the American Southwest.

Program changes
After Trenton State College changed its name to The College of New Jersey in 1996, the Trenton State Lions became the College of New Jersey (TCNJ) Lions at the start of the 1996 season.

Conference standings

Conference champions

Postseason
The 1996 NCAA Division III Football Championship playoffs were the 24th annual single-elimination tournament to determine the national champion of men's NCAA Division III college football. The championship Stagg Bowl game was held at Salem Football Stadium in Salem, Virginia for the second time. As of 2014, Salem has remained the yearly host of the Stagg Bowl. Like the previous eleven tournaments, this year's bracket featured sixteen teams.

Playoff bracket

See also
1996 NCAA Division I-A football season
1996 NCAA Division I-AA football season
1996 NCAA Division II football season
1996 NAIA Division I football season
1996 NAIA Division II football season

References